This is a list of English flags, including symbolic national and sub-national flags, standards and banners used exclusively in England.
The College of Arms is the authority on the flying of flags in England and maintains the only official register of flags. It was established in 1484 and as part of the Royal Household operates under the authority of The Crown. A separate private body called the Flag Institute, financed by its own membership, also maintains a registry of United Kingdom flags that it styles 'the UK Flag Registry', though this has no official status under English law.

Certain classes of flag enjoy a special status within English planning law and can be flown without needing planning permission as advertisements. These include any country's national flag, civil ensign or civil air ensign; the flag of the Commonwealth, the United Nations or any other international organisation of which the United Kingdom is a member; a flag of any island, county, district, borough, burgh, parish, city, town or village within the United Kingdom; the flag of the Black Country, East Anglia, Wessex, any Part of Lincolnshire, any Riding of Yorkshire or any historic county within the United Kingdom; the flag of St David; the flag of St Patrick; the flag of any administrative area within any country outside the United Kingdom; any flag of His Majesty's Armed Forces; the Armed Forces Day flag; and the flags of the National Health Service. The flag of the European Union previously held this special status but this was revoked and instead granted to the flags of the NHS on 24 March 2021, owing to heightened advocacy for the latter institution brought about by the COVID-19 Pandemic and following the United Kingdom's departure from the European Union on 31 January 2020.

National flag

Royal banner

Royal standards

Government

Church

Dioceses of the Church of England

Regional flags
Flags of the former heptarchy of Anglo-Saxon kingdoms are registered as provincial flags:

Historic counties
All 39 of the historic counties have flags registered with the Flag Institute, with Leicestershire being the last county to declare its flag, as of 16 July 2021. Some flags are traditional, meaning their designs have long been associated with the county (or in some cases, such as Kent and Sussex, an ancient kingdom), while other flags are based on the County Council arms or are winners of recent design competitions. The dates indicate the flag's date of first appearance, description, or in more recent examples, its registration with the Flag Institute.

Ceremonial counties
The counties and areas for the purposes of the lieutenancies, also referred to as the lieutenancy areas of England and informally known as ceremonial counties, are 48 areas of England to which lords-lieutenant are appointed. Legally, the areas in England, as well as in Wales and Scotland, are defined by the Lieutenancies Act 1997 as "counties and areas for the purposes of the lieutenancies in Great Britain", in contrast to the areas used for local government. They are also informally known as "geographic counties", to distinguish them from other types of counties of England.

Islands

Local government areas
Heraldic bearings are granted to individuals and corporations by the Lord Lyon in Scotland or by the College of Arms in England, Northern Ireland and Wales on behalf of the sovereign as the fount of all honours. Local authority flags come within this category when based on the arms granted to that authority, and such a flag is the authority's personal property, representing that authority rather than its area.

Cities
This a list of officially recognised flags for various cities in England. Where listed as 'official', they have been registered by the Flag Institute charity or another official source. This list may be incomplete, please add official flags with sources showing the official flag design.

Towns

University flags

Other flags

Historical flags

Royal standards

National flags and ensigns

County flags

See also
List of British flags
List of Northern Irish flags
List of Scottish flags
List of Welsh flags
List of Cornish flags
Raven banner

Footnotes
 Registered by the Flag Institute, a UK vexillology organisation that documents, guides and promotes the design, research and use of flags, but does not hold official status or authority.
 Designed by the College of Arms, the only legal body to grant official arms.

Notes

References

 
England